Su Su Lwin (born 22 April 1952) is a Burmese politician and former First Lady of Myanmar. She has been the MP for Thongwa Township in the House of Representatives since 2012. She is the wife of Htin Kyaw, the ninth President of Myanmar.

Early life and education
Su Su Lwin is the daughter of U Lwin, a veteran and former deputy prime minister of the Burma Socialist Programme Party (BSPP) regime as well as the founding member and secretary of the National League for Democracy (NLD). She is the descendant of a prince of the Konbaung dynasty Maung Maung Tin, who was a descendant of Ayodhya princess Kyauk Pwa Saw.

She spent her elementary school years in the United States. She studied at the Rangoon Institute of Education and graduated with a M.A. degree, and holds a post-graduate degree from the University of Sydney.

She married Htin Kyaw in 1973. The couple have no children.

Career

Professional educator
Su Su Lwin worked for over ten years at Burma’s education research bureau after her graduation. She worked for UNICEF from 1990 to 2005 and later served as a freelance consultant for monastic education programs. She founded a local non-profit organization called Hantha Educators in 2006 that partnered with local influential monks and focused on improving traditional monastic education, early childhood care and development programs. Her organization stressed the importance of child-centered teaching and critical thinking.

Political career

Su Su Lwin was elected for a parliamentary seat in the lower house (Pyithu Hluttaw)'s Thongwa Township constituency, in 2012 by-elections and 2015 general election. She helped to draft the controversial National Education Bill, which in 2015 resulted in nationwide student protests. She previously served as Chairperson of the International Relations Committee of the House of Representatives.

First Lady

She became the first lady of Myanmar when her husband became the president.

References

1946 births
Burmese Theravada Buddhists
First ladies of Myanmar
Living people
Members of Pyithu Hluttaw
National League for Democracy politicians
People from Yangon Region
University of Yangon alumni